Rebecca "Becky" Holliday is an American pole vaulter, born March 12, 1980. She placed 2nd at the 2012 US Olympic trials in Eugene, Oregon with a final clearance of 14-11 (4.55m), qualifying her for the 2012 Summer Olympics where she finished 9th in the finals. In 2003, as a senior competing for the University of Oregon, Holliday placed 1st at the NCAA Outdoor Championships. Her personal record is 4.60m, set in Des Moines, Iowa in 2010.

Holliday began pole vaulting at Reed High School in Sparks, Nevada.  Jumping 11' 9" she won the Nevada state title in her second year of vaulting.  Previous to taking up the pole vault, she had been a gymnast.  Her next stop was at Clackamas Community College just outside Portland, Oregon, where she improved to 14' 4" (4.37m) to set the still standing Community College record in the event in 2001.

She is a member of the Church of Jesus Christ of Latter-day Saints.

References

1980 births
Living people
American female pole vaulters
Oregon Ducks women's track and field athletes
University of Oregon alumni
Sportspeople from Sparks, Nevada
Latter Day Saints from Nevada
Athletes (track and field) at the 2012 Summer Olympics
Olympic track and field athletes of the United States
Pan American Games bronze medalists for the United States
Pan American Games medalists in athletics (track and field)
Athletes (track and field) at the 2011 Pan American Games
Medalists at the 2011 Pan American Games